The 2019–20 season of the Norwegian Premier League, the highest bandy league for men in Norway.

Eighteen games were played, with 2 points given for wins and 1 for draws. Ready won the league, whereas Øvrevoll Hosle were relegated and Høvik survived a relegation playoff.

League table

References

Seasons in Norwegian bandy
2019 in bandy
2020 in bandy
Bandy
Bandy